Enoch Francis Mort (5 March 1912 – 1999) was a Welsh professional footballer who played in the Football League as a centre-half for Cardiff City and Carlisle United.

Career

Born in Ogmore Vale, Mort played amateur football for Gilfach Goch before joining Cardiff City in February 1934. He made his first-team debut on 3 March 1934 in a 3–1 victory over Queens Park Rangers and remained in the side for the final twelve matches of the season. However, at the end of the season, Cardiff signed Billy Bassett who became first choice. Mort remained with Cardiff until 1938, making sporadic appearances, before joining Carlisle United.

He was a cousin of Aston Villa defender Tommy Mort.

References

1912 births
1999 deaths
Welsh footballers
Footballers from Bridgend
Cardiff City F.C. players
Carlisle United F.C. players
English Football League players
Association football central defenders